This article contains a listing of Dean Martin's original singles, LPs, and compilations from his career.

Overview 
Martin recorded his first single, "Which Way Did My Heart Go" / "All of Me", for the small Diamond Records in July 1946. The majority of the singer's recordings were released on Capitol Records (1948–1961) and later on Frank Sinatra's Reprise Records (1962–1974). Martin had many hit singles during his lifetime, but only two went to No. 1 on the pop charts—"Memories Are Made of This" in 1956 and "Everybody Loves Somebody" nearly a decade later. A close runner-up was "That's Amore", which stalled at No. 2. Other top tens included "Powder Your Face with Sunshine" (No. 10), "Return to Me" (No. 4), "The Door Is Still Open to My Heart" (No. 6), and "I Will" (No. 10).

After "Volare" reached No. 12 in August 1958, Martin experienced a six-year period in his recording career without any significant single activity, exacerbated by changing pop trends and his focus on movie roles. A song strongly associated with Martin, "Ain't That a Kick in the Head?," never charted when released as a single. His highest-charting single during that span was "On an Evening in Roma" which barely registered at No. 59. It would take "Everybody Loves Somebody" to rejuvenate his chart decline.

"Everybody Loves Somebody" also introduced Martin to the Easy Listening charts. From 1964 to 1969, he had great success there, as 20 of his singles reached the top ten. The final year that the singer had any significant chart success on either chart was 1969, with "Gentle on My Mind", "I Take a Lot of Pride in What I Am", and "One Cup of Happiness" doing moderately well. One major surprise came in the United Kingdom, as "Gentle on My Mind" reached No. 2.

The crooner had two singles chart on Billboard's Country chart—"My First Country Song" (No. 35), featuring Conway Twitty, was appropriately the first in 1983. As early as 1959, Martin had expressed his love of country music ("My Rifle, My Pony, and Me"). Within a year of signing with Reprise, Martin had recorded his first country album, Country Style, released in January 1963. He continued to record country music prolifically until he retired, yet country radio refused to play his singles.

A total of 32 original studio albums were released in Martin's career. His most critically well-regarded projects were released on Capitol Records in the late 1950s—e.g. Sleep Warm (1959) and This Time I'm Swingin'! (1960). Nevertheless, the singer had no significant album chart success until he signed with Reprise Records in the early 1960s.

The Everybody Loves Somebody 1964 compilation album was Martin's best-selling album, narrowly missing the top spot at No. 2. The Dean Martin Christmas Album, released in 1966, became a perennial best-seller throughout the late 1960s and early 1970s, hitting No. 1 on Billboard's Christmas chart.

Other albums that made the Top 20 Pop Albums chart include Dream with Dean (No. 15), The Door Is Still Open to My Heart (No. 9), Dean Martin Hits Again (No. 13), (Remember Me) I'm the One Who Loves You (No. 12), Houston (No. 11), Welcome to My World (No. 20), and Gentle on My Mind (No. 14).

Martin virtually retired from the studio after November 1974, exacerbated by Reprise's decision to withhold the Once in a While project. The label believed Martin paying tribute to his influences would not sell well at the height of disco. The label finally reversed its decision four years later after embellishing the backing tracks with a more modern, disco-flavored rhythm section. Once in a While concluded the artist's association with Reprise.

His longtime producer, Jimmy Bowen, persuaded Martin to record one more album, and The Nashville Sessions, released on Warner Brothers, became a moderate success in 1983. The crooner's recording career ended in July 1985, when he recorded the non-charting single, "L.A. Is My Home". Despite the singer's renowned for his ease in front of audiences, no live albums were made available until after his passing in 1995.

Demand for Martin's recordings continues to be significantly high in the new millennium. Capitol and Collectors' Choice Music re-released Martin's original studio albums. Bear Family Records, one of the world's leading reissue labels based in Germany, chronicled the singer's complete recording sessions in four lavish box sets. Capitol's 2004 compilation, Dino: The Essential Dean Martin, was certified platinum by the RIAA.

Country singer Martina McBride overdubbed her vocal onto Martin's original version of "Baby It's Cold Outside" two years later for Capitol's Forever Cool duets project, resulting in a top 40 country/top 10 Adult Contemporary hit, Martin's first single activity since "My First Country Song" 23 years earlier. The album featured overdubbed duets with McBride, Kevin Spacey, Dave Koz, Chris Botti, Shelby Lynne, Big Bad Voodoo Daddy and more. A duet of "I'll Be Home for Christmas" with Scarlett Johansson was added to Martin's My Kind of Christmas CD.

Cool Then, Cool Now, a two-CD/book released on Hip-O Records in 2011, examined the artist's signature hits along with a significant dose of lesser-known recordings.

Albums

Studio albums

Posthumous live albums

Compilation albums

Soundtrack albums

Box sets

Extended plays

Singles

Early singles

Capitol

{| class="wikitable" style="text-align:center;"
|-
! rowspan="2" | Year
! rowspan="2" width="400" | Single
! colspan="4" |Chart positions
! rowspan="2" | Album
|- style="font-size:smaller;"
! width="40" |US
! width="40" |US CB
! width="40" |UK
! width="40" |AUS
|-
| 1948
| align="left" | "That Certain Party" (with Jerry Lewis)
| 22
| —
| —
| —
| rowspan="2" align="center" | —
|-
| 1949
| align="left" | "Powder Your Face with Sunshine (Smile, Smile, Smile)"
| 10
| —
| —
| —
|-
| 1950
| align="left" | "I'll Always Love You"
| 11
| —
| —
| —
| rowspan="1" align="center" |Happy in Love (Compilation rel. 8/2/66 via Tower Records)
|-
| rowspan="2" | 1951
| align="left" | "Ma Come Bali (Bella Bimba)"
| —
| —
| —
| 8
| rowspan="1" align="center" | —
|-
| align="left" | "If"
| 14
| —
| —
| —
| rowspan="1" align="center" |You Can't Love 'Em All (Pickwick Budget LP)
|-
| 1952
| align="left" | "You Belong to Me"
| 12
| —
| —
| 1
| rowspan="1" align="center" | —
|-
| rowspan="3" | 1953
| align="left" | "Love Me, Love Me"
| 25
| —
| —
| —
| rowspan="1" align="center" |Hey, Brother, Pour the Wine
|-
| align="left" | "Kiss"
| —
| —
| 5
| —
| rowspan="1" align="center" | —
|-
| align="left" | "That's Amore"
| 2
| 2
| 2
| 1
| rowspan="1" align="center" |Sunny Italy (EP rel. 12/7/53) & Dean Martin Sings (12" LP Version)
|-
| rowspan="9" | 1954
| align="left" | "I'd Cry Like a Baby"
| 21
| —
| —
| —
| rowspan="1" align="center" |Single only
|-
| align="left" | "Hey Brother Pour the Wine" (B-side of "I'd Cry Like a Baby")
| —
| 30
| —
| —
| rowspan="2" align="center" |Hey, Brother, Pour the Wine
|-
| align="left" | "Sway"
| 15
| 13
| 6
| 1
|-
| align="left" | "Money Burns a Hole in My Pocket" (B-side of "Sway")
| 23
| —
| —
| —
| rowspan="2" align="center" |Living It Up (EP rel. 6/7/54)
|-
| align="left" | "How Do You Speak to an Angel"
| —
| —
| 15
| —
|-
| align="left" | "That's What I Like"
| —
| 29
| —
| —
| rowspan="4" align="center" | —
|-
| align="left" | "The Peddler Man" (B-side of "That's What I Like")
| —
| 33
| —
| —
|-
| align="left" | "Try Again"
| —
| 36
| —
| —
|-
| align="left" | "One More Time" (B-side of "Try Again")
| —
| 44
| —
| —
|-
| rowspan="10" | 1955
| align="left" | "The Naughty Lady of Shady Lane" (UK & AU Single only)
| —
| —
| 5
| 1
| rowspan="4" align="center" |Dean Martin (EP rel. December 13, 1954)
|-
| align="left" | "Mambo Italiano" (UK & AU Single only)
| —
| —
| 14
| 2
|-
| align="left" | "Let Me Go Lover" (UK & AU Single only)
| —
| —
| 3
| 1
|-
| align="left" | "That's All I Want from You" (UK & AU Single only)
| —
| —
| —
| 4
|-
| align="left" | "Young and Foolish"
| —
| 34
| 20
| —
| rowspan="4" align="center" | —
|-
| align="left" | "Under the Bridges of Paris" (B-side of "Young and Foolish")
| —
| —
| 6
| —
|-
| align="left" | "Open Up the Doghouse"  (with Nat King Cole)
| —
| 22
| —
| 19
|-
| align="left" | "Chee Chee-Oo Chee (Sang The Little Bird)"
| —
| —
| —
| 8
|-
| align="left" | "Memories Are Made of This"
| 1
| 1
| 1
| 1
| rowspan="1" align="center" |Memories Are Made of This (EP rel. December 12, 1955) & Hey, Brother, Pour the Wine
|-
| align="left" | "Relax-ay-Voo"
| —
| —
| —
| 16
| rowspan="1" align="center" |Single only
|-
| rowspan="8" | 1956
| align="left" | "Innamorata"
| 27
| 17
| 21
| 20
| rowspan="1" align="center" |Artists and Models (EP rel. December 26, 1955)
|-
| align="left" | "Standing on the Corner"
| 22
| —
| —
| —
| rowspan="1" align="center" |Hey, Brother, Pour the Wine
|-
| align="left" | "Watching the World Go By" (B-side of "Standing on the Corner")
| 83
| —
| —
| —
| rowspan="4" align="center" | —
|-
| align="left" | "Lady with the Big Umbrella"
| —
| —
| —
| 21
|-
| align="left" | "I'm Gonna Steal You Away"
| —
| —
| —
| —
|-
| align="left" | "Mississippi Dreamboat"
| —
| —
| —
| —
|-
| align="left" | "The Look"
| —
| —
| —
| —
| rowspan="2" align="center" |This Is Dean Martin!
|-
| align="left" | "I Know I Can't Forget"
| —
| —
| —
| —
|-
| rowspan="6" | 1957
| align="left" | "The Man Who Plays the Mandolino"
| —
| —
| 21
| —
| rowspan="1" align="center" |Hey, Brother, Pour the Wine
|-
| align="left" | "Only Trust Your Heart"
| —
| —
| —
| —
| rowspan="1" align="center" |Ten Thousand Bedrooms (EP)
|-
| align="left" | "I Never Had a Chance"
| —
| —
| —
| —
| rowspan="1" align="center" |The Lush Years
|-
| align="left" | "Write to Me from Naples"
| —
| —
| —
| —
| rowspan="2" align="center" |This Is Dean Martin!
|-
| align="left" | "Promise Her Anything"
| —
| —
| —
| —
|-
| align="left" | "Good Mornin' Life"
| —
| —
| —
| —
| rowspan="1" align="center" | —
|-
| rowspan="5" | 1958
| align="left" | "Return to Me"
| 4
| 3
| 2
| 3
| rowspan="1" align="center" |Return to Me (EP rel. April 21, 1958) & This Is Dean Martin! LP
|-
| align="left" | "Angel Baby"
| 30
| 38
| —
| 57
| rowspan="2" align="center" |Volare (EP rel. 8/11/58) & This Is Dean Martin! LP
|-
| align="left" | "Volare"
| 12
| 1
| 2
| 1
|-
| align="left" | "The Magician"
| —
| —
| —
| 92
| rowspan="2" align="center" | —
|-
| align="left" | "Once Upon a Time" (B-side of "The Magician")
| —
| 94
| —
| —
|-
| rowspan="5" | 1959
| align="left" | "You Were Made for Love"
| —
| —
| —
| —
| rowspan="1" align="center" |Happy in Love
|-
| align="left" | "It Takes So long" (B-side of "You Were Made For Love")
| —
| 80
| —
| —
| rowspan="2" align="center" |The Lush Years
|-
| align="left" | "Rio Bravo"
| —
| —
| —
| —
|-
| align="left" | "On an Evening in Roma" (Single Version)
| 59
| 36
| —
| 26
| rowspan="1" align="center" | Single only: (a 1961 version is on Dino: Italian Love Songs)
|-
| align="left" | "I Ain't Gonna Lead This Life No More"
| —
| —
| —
| —
| rowspan="1" align="center" |You Can't Love 'Em All (Pickwick Budget LP)
|-
| rowspan="6" | 1960
| align="left" | "Love Me, My Love"
| 107
| 110
| —
| —
| rowspan="1" align="center" |The Lush Years
|-
| align="left" | "Who Was That Lady?" (B-side of "Love Me, My Love")
| —
| tag
| —
| —
| rowspan="1" align="center" |Relaxin'''
|-
| align="left" | "Professor! Professor!"
| —
| —
| —
| —
| rowspan="1" align="center" | —
|-
| align="left" | "Just in Time"
| —
| —
| —
| —
| rowspan="1" align="center" |This Time I'm Swingin'!|-
| align="left" | "Ain't That a Kick in the Head?"
| —
| —
| —
| —
| rowspan="1" align="center" |You Can't Love 'Em All (Pickwick Budget LP)
|-
| align="left" | "Sogni d'oro"
| —
| —
| —
| —
| rowspan="1" align="center" | —
|-
| rowspan="3" | 1961
| align="left" | "Sparklin' Eyes"
| —
| 98
| —
| —
| rowspan="1" align="center" |Relaxin'|-
| align="left" | "All in a Night's Work (Movie Theme Song)
| —
| —
| —
| —
| rowspan="1" align="center" |I Can't Give You Anything but Love (Pickwick Budget LP)
|-
| align="left" | "Giuggiola"
| —
| —
| —
| —
| rowspan="1" align="center" | —
|-
| colspan="7" style="text-align:center; font-size:9pt;"| "—" denotes releases that did not chart or were not released in that territory.
|}

Reprise

Warner Bros.

MCA

Posthumous singles (Capitol)

Holiday 100 chart entries
Since many radio stations in the US adopt a format change to Christmas music each December, many holiday hits have an annual spike in popularity during the last few weeks of the year and are retired once the season is over. In December 2011, Billboard began a Holiday Songs chart with 50 positions that monitors the last five weeks of each year to "rank the top holiday hits of all eras using the same methodology as the Hot 100, blending streaming, airplay, and sales data", and in 2013 the number of positions on the chart was doubled, resulting in the Holiday 100. A half dozen Martin recordings have made appearances on the Holiday 100 and are noted below according to the holiday season in which they charted there.

 Notes 

 References 

Further reading
 All Music Guide. "Dean Martin Discography".
 Whitburn, Joel (2011). Record Research Online Database. "Dean Martin" Billboard'' Chart Discography. Retrieved April 21, 2011.

External links 
 Dean Martin Album Discography at the All Music Guide
 Dean Martin's Complete (Singles, EPs, and LPs) Discography at Switzerland's Music Lovers
 

Discographies of American artists
Pop music discographies